Waymouth is a surname. Notable people with the surname include:

Edward Waymouth Reid (1862–1948), British physiologist
Henry Waymouth (1791–1848), one of the British founding directors of the South Australian Company in 1835
Louis Waymouth (born 1978), British writer and actor
Nigel Waymouth (born 1941), American designer and artist
Robert Waymouth (born 1960), American chemist